The 2023 Sam Houston Bearkats football team will represent Sam Houston State University in Conference USA during the 2023 NCAA Division I FBS football season. The Bearkats are expected to be led by K.C. Keeler in his tenth year as head coach. They play their home games at Bowers Stadium in Huntsville, Texas. They are ineligible for a bowl game, the conference championship, or the College Football Playoff due to rules governing transitions from FCS to FBS.

Previous season 

The Bearkats finished with a 5–4 record. While Sam Houston played in the Western Athletic Conference (WAC), it had begun its transition from FCS to FBS in advance of the 2022 season, rendering it ineligible for the FCS playoffs and WAC Championship.

Offseason

Transfers

Outgoing

Incoming

Schedule
Sam Houston and Conference USA announced the 2023 football schedule on January 10, 2023.

Game summaries

at BYU

Air Force

at Houston

Jacksonville State

at Liberty

at New Mexico State

FIU

UTEP

Kennesaw State

at Louisiana Tech

at Western Kentucky

Middle Tennessee

References

Sam Houston
Sam Houston Bearkats football seasons
Sam Houston State Bearkats football